Vitaliy Viktorovych Yehorov or Vitali Egorov (born 23 March 1964) is a former competitive figure skater for the Soviet Union. He is the 1986 Skate Canada International champion, the 1986 Nebelhorn Trophy champion, the 1979 World Junior champion, a two-time (1983, 1987) Winter Universiade silver medalist, and the 1984 Soviet national champion.

Egorov was one of the first skaters in the world to land a triple Axel jump, performing it in April 1981, at the USSR Cup competition in Sverdlovsk, where he won the bronze medal. In March 1982, he won the 5th USSR Winter Spartakiada. He is a coach in Kharkiv.

Results

References

Navigation

Soviet male single skaters
Ukrainian male single skaters
1964 births
Living people
Sportspeople from Kharkiv
World Junior Figure Skating Championships medalists
Universiade medalists in figure skating
Universiade silver medalists for the Soviet Union
Competitors at the 1983 Winter Universiade
Competitors at the 1987 Winter Universiade